Jalalabad (also Romanized as Jalālābād) is a village in Ravar Rural District, in the Central District of Ravar County, Kerman Province, Iran. At the 2006 census, its population was 543, in 148 families.

References 

Populated places in Ravar County